Riyatno Abiyoso (born 18 January 1999) is an Indonesian professional footballer who plays as a winger for Liga 1 club Persik Kediri.

Club career

Persela Lamongan
He was signed for Persela Lamongan to play in Liga 1 in the 2019 season. Abiyoso made his debut on 27 October 2019 in a match against Kalteng Putra. On 16 December 2019, he scored his first goal for Persela in a 1–1 draw over TIRA-Persikabo at the Pakansari Stadium. Five days later, Abiyoso scored the opening goal in a 2–0 win over Semen Padang. Abiyoso finished the season with two goal in 10 league appearances, and for the 2020 season, Abiyoso only played 3 times for the club because the league was officially discontinued due to the COVID-19 pandemic.

Abiyoso started and played the whole 90 minutes for the first time in Liga 1 in a 0–1 lose against Persita Tangerang on 17 September 2021. Abiyoso scored his first league goals of the season in a 1–1 draw over PS Barito Putera, scoring a opening goal, on 29 October. Abiyoso finished the season with 4 goals in 30 appearances.

Persik Kediri
Abiyoso was signed for Persik Kediri to play in Liga 1 in the 2022–23 season. Abiyoso made his league debut on 25 July 2022 in a match against Persita Tangerang at the Indomilk Arena, Tangerang. On 18 August 2022, Abiyoso scored his first league goal for Persik Kediri in a 2–1 lose over PSIS Semarang at Jatidiri Stadium.

On 19 January 2023, Abiyoso scored the winning goal in a 2–3 away win over Bhayangkara. Five days later, Abiyoso scored in a 2–0 win over Madura United; which made Persik Kediri win 2 times in a row in Liga 1. On 9 February 2023, Abiyoso scored in a 2–1 lose over PSS Sleman.

Career statistics

Club

Notes

References

External links
 Riyatno Abiyoso at Soccerway
 Riyatno Abiyoso at Liga Indonesia

1999 births
Living people
Indonesian footballers
Liga 1 (Indonesia) players
Persela Lamongan players
Persik Kediri players
Association football midfielders
People from Purworejo Regency
Sportspeople from Central Java